Mir Abu Turab's Tomb, locally known as Qadam-e-Rasul ki Dargah is a medieval tomb in Behrampura, Ahmedabad, India.

History 
Mir Abu Turab was the chief of the army during Mughal rule of Akbar. In 1579, appointed chief of the Mecca caravan, he brought back a large stone from Mecca with a footprint of the Prophet Mohammed in 1582 (987 H.). This stone is said to have been the same which Syed Jalal-i-Bukhari brought to Delhi at the time of Sultan Firuz Shah Tughlaq. Taken first to Akbar at Fatehpur Sikri, Akbar looked on the whole as a pious fraud, and though the stone was received with great respect, Abu Turab was allowed to keep it in his house. When (1583) Itimad was made Governor of Gujarat, Abu Turab followed him as Amin of the Suba and was buried at Ahmedabad in 1597 (1005 H). The relic was afterwards brought to Ahmedabad, and perhaps near his tomb, had a building raised over it, and drew large numbers of pilgrims. In the disturbed times of the eighteenth century, as the suburbs were no longer safe, the stone was taken within the city walls. He also wrote a book on history of Gujarat, Tarikh-i-Gujarat.

The tomb was damaged in 2001 Gujarat earthquake and was restored in 2002 by Archaeological Survey of India.

Architecture

Mir Abu Turab's tomb is simple and graceful, 12.5 sq m (forty-one feet) square platform with a double colonnade of pillars, the inner colonnade formerly enclosed by stone trellis work. Local in style the tomb shows the art in its best form. The flat lintels have throughout given place to the arch, and as no rich minaret bases clash with the plainness of the main building, the whole is uniform and pleasing. On each face three large and two small arches point to the presence of an octagonal dome, and, without confusing, relieve the sameness. The dome is supported by twelve pillars.

References 

Tombs in Ahmedabad
Buildings and structures completed in 1597